Boussouma Department is a department or commune of Boulgou Province in eastern Burkina Faso. The capital is Boussouma. The population of the department was 26,473 in 2006.

Towns and villages
Note: Populations are a 2005 estimate.
 Boussouma (4,027 inhabitants) (Capital)
 Bangagou (1,544 inhabitants) 
 Batto (1,681 inhabitants) 
 Boussouma-Peulh (299 inhabitants) 
 Dango (2,093 inhabitants) 
 Dierma (2,446 inhabitants) 
 Koumbore (1,780 inhabitants) 
 Lengha (2,989 inhabitants) 
 Lengha-Peulh (309 inhabitants) 
 Massougou (325 inhabitants) 
 Nonka (571 inhabitants) 
 Ouazi (878 inhabitants) 
 Saaba (2,511 inhabitants) 
 Saregou (551 inhabitants) 
 Tengsoba (1,691 inhabitants) 
 Zabga (1,974 inhabitants)

References

Departments of Burkina Faso
Boulgou Province